Paul Lawson may refer to:
Paul M. Lawson (1914–1988), American politician
Paul Lawson (boxer) (born 1966), British boxer
Paul Lawson (footballer) (born 1984), Scottish footballer